Marlfox is a fantasy novel by Brian Jacques, published in 1998. It is the 11th book published and 13th chronologically in the Redwall series. Marlfoxes are an unusual breed of anthropomorphic foxes, which serve as the main antagonists in the book.

Plot summary
The wandering Noonvale companions travel to Redwall, where they wish to mount a show. On the way, however, they learn that the Marlfoxes will attempt to seize Redwall, and hasten onward to warn them, while Guosim from another part of Mossflower do the same.

The Marlfoxes consist of High Queen Silth and her brood. They are different from other foxes in their fur, which gives them the ability to blend into almost any surrounding, invisible to all but the keenest eye. This ability has given rise to the false rumour that the Marlfoxes are magic, which they are not. However, Marlfoxes are highly agile and skilled with axes.

Castle Marl, home of the Marlfoxes, is situated in the middle of an enormous inland sea, on the island that was once home to Badger Lord Urthwyte the Mighty. The Marlfoxes command a vast army of water rats, and they travel around the country seeking rare and priceless artifacts.

The Marlfoxes, backed by an army of water rats, mount a successful invasion of Redwall and steal the tapestry of the long dead hero, Martin the Warrior. The Marlfox Ziral is slain, however, and the remaining Marlfoxes swear revenge on the citizens of Redwall.

Mokkan, one of the Marlfoxes, escapes with the tapestry, leaving his siblings behind. Three young Redwallers, Songbreeze Swifteye, Dannflor Reguba, and a Guosim shrew named Dippler set out after Mokkan, trying to retrieve the tapestry. They meet Burble, a water vole, and have many adventures and meet many friends who help them on their journey, such as the gigantic hedgehog Sollertree, who lost his daughter Nettlebud to the Marlfoxes and water rats, and the Mighty Megraw, a large osprey who used to live by the Marlfox island but was driven away in an ambush by magpies.

Meanwhile, the remaining Marlfoxes lay siege to Redwall. After a series of battles, Songbreeze's father Janglur Swifteye, Dannflor's father Rusvul Reguba, Cregga Rose Eyes, and many others fight off the remaining army, killing the remaining Marlfoxes and restoring peace to Redwall. The surviving rats are divided into eight groups, with each group sent in a different direction.

Song, Dann, Dippler and Burble meet some new friends and set out into the great lake to the island. Mokkan finds that Silth has been killed by one of his sisters, Lantur. He promptly kills her by pushing her into the lake full of pike, proclaiming himself King. However, the companions arrive and overthrow the water rat army. Mokkan escapes in a boat, but an escaped slave, whom we find out is Nettlebud, throws a chain at him and knocks him into the lake, where he is eaten by pike.

The surviving water rats are left on the island to become peaceful creatures and farm the land, and the companions return home to Redwall, where Songbreeze Swifteye is named Abbess and Dannflor Reguba is named Abbey Champion by Cregga Rose Eyes, Redwall's blind badgermum. Dippler is named Log-a-log, and Burble is named Chief of the Watervoles.

At the end of the novel is a note, stating that the entire tale was made into a drama, edited by one Florian Dugglewoof Wilffachop.

Characters in Marlfox

Redwallers and companions
Songbreeze Swifteye
Dannflor Reguba
Dippler
Burble
Janglur Swifteye
Rusvul Reguba
Cregga Rose Eyes
Florian Dugglewoof Wilffachop
Mighty Megraw
Gawjo Swifteye
Nutwing

Marlfoxes

The "Marl" sub-species of foxes portrayed in Marlfox actually do exist. Silver coloured foxes are a rare colour mutation of the common red fox. In the novel, the Marlfox characters are:

Silth
The King
Ascrod
Gelltor
Lantur
Mokkan
Predak
Vannan
Ziral

Book divisions (English) 
Act 1: Enter the Players
Act 2: Four Chieftains Going Forth
Act 3: The Queen's Island

(These divisions are called "acts," instead of "books," as in the other instalments of the series. This is explained by a note at the end stating that it had been edited by Florian, the hare leader of the Wandering Noonvale Companions.)

Translations
(French) Rougemuraille : Les Ombrenards
(Italian) La Regina di Castel Vulpombra
(Russian) Белые лисы

References

External links
 Plot summary

1998 British novels
1998 children's books
1998 fantasy novels
British children's novels
British fantasy novels
Children's fantasy novels
Redwall books
Books about foxes
Literature featuring anthropomorphic foxes
Hutchinson (publisher) books